Surbhi Chandna (born 11 September 1989) is an Indian actress. She made her acting debut in 2009 with the role of Sweety in Taarak Mehta Ka Ooltah Chashmah and had her first major role in Qubool Hai as Haya. Chandna is best known for her portrayal of Annika Oberoi in Ishqbaaaz and Bani Singhania in supernatural franchise Naagin 5. She is currently seen portraying Manmeet Shergill in Colors TV's romantic Sherdil Shergill.

Early life
Chandna was born on 11 September 1989 in Mumbai, Maharashtra.

Career
Chandna debuted on television in 2009 with a cameo in the most longest-running sitcom ever, Taarak Mehta Ka Ooltah Chashmah that airs on Sony SAB. After a break of four years, she essayed Suzanne in Star Plus's Ek Nanad Ki Khushiyon Ki Chaabi… Meri Bhabhi.

From 2014 to 2015, she portrayed the deaf and mute Haya in Zee TV's romantic drama Qubool Hai. In 2015, she had a small part as Aamna Khan in her first Bollywood venture, the Vidya Balan starrer Bobby Jasoos.

From 2016 to 2018, Chandna played Annika Oberoi in Star Plus's Ishqbaaaz. For her performance, she won several awards including the Indian Television Academy Award, Asian Viewers Television Award, Gold Award and Lions Gold Award. In 2017, she also appeared in the spin-off of Ishqbaaaz titled Dil Boley Oberoi.

From 2019 to 2020, Chandna portrayed Dr.Ishani Arora in Star Plus's Sanjivani. From 2020 to 2021, she portrayed Bani Singhania in Colors TV's Naagin opposite Sharad Malhotra.

Her debut music video appearance was with Bepanah Pyaar alongside Sharad Malhotra in 2021.

In 2022, she debuted as a host, on Hunarbaaz replacing Bharti Singh.

Filmography

Television

Special appearances

Films

Music videos

Awards and nominations

 Chandna was ranked at No. 4 in The Times Most Desirable Women on TV 2020.

See also
 List of Hindi television actresses
 List of Indian television actresses
List of accolades received by Ishqbaaaz

References

External links 

Living people
Actresses from Mumbai
21st-century Indian actresses
Actresses in Hindi cinema
Actresses in Hindi television
Indian film actresses
Indian television actresses
Indian soap opera actresses
1989 births